Michalis Karavasilis (born 14 November 1975 in Mytilene, Lesbos) is a retired Greek footballer. As a goalkeeper, he played 17 seasons for Aiolikos including their last spell in the Gamma Ethniki.

References

1975 births
Living people
Greek footballers
Association football goalkeepers
Aiolikos F.C. players
People from Mytilene
Sportspeople from the North Aegean